No Activity is an Australian comedy television series which streams on Stan. The series is about two detectives on a stakeout. The Australian series was the first commission produced for the Australian streaming service. It comes from the production company Jungle Entertainment, a partnership between Trent O'Donnell, Jason Burrows, Chloe Rickard and Phil Lloyd. It is written and directed by Trent O'Donnell with Executive Producer Jason Burrows and Producer Chloe Rickard. The first season, consisting of six episodes, premiered in its entirety on 22 October 2015. The second season was released on 26 October 2016.

A one-off Christmas special titled No Activity: The Night Before Christmas was commissioned and premiered on Stan in December 2018.

Cast   
 Patrick Brammall as Detective Hendy, a young and ambitious detective keen to restore his reputation after a disastrous drug bust.
 Darren Gilshenan as Detective Stokes, a lovable dreamer whose detective work leaves a lot to be desired.
 Daniel Wyllie as Jimmy, a colorful character who has returned to a life of crime after his failed endeavour in hospitality.
 Harriet Dyer as April, a young police officer who is ready for reinstatement into active duty after a stint in dispatch following an unfortunate tasering incident. When the opportunity finally arises, she has mixed feelings about leaving Carol and the dispatch crew behind.
 Genevieve Morris as Carol, a straight talking police dispatch officer, who isn't afraid to call you out if you're an arsehole; babies and disabled people included.
 David Field as Bruce, an older career criminal with an unlikely passion for fine art and a talent for the mandolin. His prior attempts at going straight have met with mixed success, but after sensing something isn't right about the kidnapping job, he comes up with an idea for a new venture.
 Damon Herriman as Bernie (season 2), a wealthy businessman who spends most of his money on unsuccessful charity fundraisers hosted by his wife. In a marriage that has been loveless for years, the kidnapping might be the best thing that's ever happened to him.
 Rose Byrne as Elizabeth (season 2), Bernie's wife who hasn't seen him naked in ten years. She enjoys his credit card much more than she does his company. The kidnapping forces her to question how she'd wish to die, with some unexpected results.
 Kim Gyngell as Rainer (season 2), an older detective who, some say, should have retired 10 years ago. His clear disdain for his new partner Stokes raises his temper to deadly effect.
 Chum Ehelepola as Steve (season 2), a budding criminal who desperately wants to be Australia's best kidnapper of Sri Lankan descent, even if he's the only one. Learning the ropes as an underworld criminal, he's sure his parents would be proud of what he's accomplished in his first outing in the big leagues.
 Anthony Hayes as Neddy, a criminal partnered with Steve by the powers that be in the criminal hierarchy. Neddy's been around the traps, seen a lot and done some bad things. Prior to becoming a criminal, he worked as security in a brothel, a job that gave him a lot of hands on experience, and he's not shy of sharing it with his inexperienced partner in crime.
 Sam Simmons as Glen.
 Susie Youssef as Anousha (season 2), a young, tech- and social media-savvy dispatch officer. A product of modern society, who challenges Carol's more traditional ideas of Muslim culture, she's a keen roller derby aficionado and introduces Carol to the sport.
 Jake Johnson as Cutler (season 1).
 Tim Minchin as Jacob (season 1).

Episodes

Season 1 (2015)

Season 2 (2016)

Reception
The show was met with positive reviews. Justin Burke of The Australian wrote that it is "the funniest new comedy I’ve seen in years". James Mitchell from The Sydney Morning Herald suggested it was "the Seinfeld of Cop Shows".

Awards and nominations
No Activity became the first SVOD program ever nominated for a Logie Award in 2016.

American adaptation

In October 2017, it was announced that CBS was developing their own version of the Australian series, No Activity with Will Ferrell, Adam McKay along with their production company, Funny or Die, as executive producers. The series was greenlit for an 8-episode first season which premiered on 12 November 2017 on CBS All Access. The series stars Patrick Brammall (from the Australian series) as Det. Nick Cullen and Tim Meadows as Det. Judd Tolbeck with a range of guest stars such as Mackenzie Davis, Jason Mantzoukas, Jesse Plemons, J.K. Simmons, Michaela Watkins, Jake Johnson (guest starred on the Australian series) along with Ferrell himself.

Arabic adaptation

In August 2021, it was announced that OSN was developing their own version of the Australian series, No Activity with Sally Waly along with their production company, S Productions as executive producers Trent O'Donnell and Chloe Rickard. The series was greenlit for an 6-episode first season which premiered on 5 September 2021 on OSN Yahala, OSN & S Productions collaborate on their first comedy-drama series: No Activity - الوضع مستقر (El Wad3 Mostaker).

Sproductions company, by Sally Wali, cooperates for the second time with OSN through the series “No Activity/El Wadea Mostaker,” which is the first drama that brings the two entities together.

Created by Jungle Entertainment Jungle Entertainment's Executive Producers Trent O'Donnell Chloe Rickard.

Distributed by MassMedia International.

No Activity will be launched exclusively on the OSN channel group, starting from September 5., and a local version of No Activity produced by S Productions for OSN.

No Activity will be the Arabic version of the series, which was previously released in Australian and American versions.

Meanwhile, Egyptian comedy drama Elwada’a Mustaqer (aka No Activity) sees some of the country's top comedic talent, such as Khaled Mansour, Shadi Alfons and Sayed Ragab, take a satirical, light-hearted look at the misadventures of cops and criminals.

The 6 x 30-minute series tells the story of two security guards on a stakeout, along with a pair of criminals who discuss their personal lives while all waiting for a crime to take place.

No Activity was originally created by Trent O’Donnell and Patrick Brammall and written by Trent O'Donnell and produced by Jungle Entertainment and distributed by MassMedia International, executive producers Trent O'Donnell and Chloe Rickard. for Australian streaming service Stan in 2015.

The series is an Arabic adaptation of the original American and Australian series under the same name. It will air on 5 September on OSN channels and will consist of 6 episodes.

El Wad3 Mostaker stars Shady Alfons, Sayed Ragab, Khaled Mansour, Entisar, Enjoy Kiwan & Mohamed Gomaa.

The announcement revealed humorous situations that brought together all the series heroes, which reviews youth problems in a comic framework in a world we do not know much about.

The series stars Shadi Alfons, Khaled Mansour, Sayed Ragab, Intisar, Mohamed Gomaa, Ahmed Sultan, Taa Desoky and Engy Kiwan, dramatist Mahmoud Ezzat, and directed by Wael Farag.

Japanese adaptation

No Activity‘s Japanese adaptation stars Etsushi Toyokawa and Tomoya Nakamura. Tsutomu Hanabusa directs the series, whose scripts are written by Jiro of the comedy duo Sissonne. The series was premiered on Amazon Prime Video on 17 December 2021.

See also
 Nothing to Report

References

2015 Australian television series debuts
2018 Australian television series endings
2010s Australian comedy television series
2010s sitcoms
Australian television sitcoms
English-language television shows
Stan (service) original programming